Luigi Di Pasquale may refer to:

 Luigi Di Pasquale (footballer born 1919), Italian footballer who played for Roma in the 1930s and 1940s
 Luigi Di Pasquale (footballer born 1980), Italian footballer who played for Brescia in the 2000s, see :it:Luigi Di Pasquale